Bailey House may refer to:

Places in the United States

 Bailey House (Warren, Arkansas)
 Routh-Bailey House, in Fayetteville, Arkansas
 Bailey House (Los Angeles), California
 Stuart Bailey House, designed by Richard Neutra
 Jonathan Bailey House (Whittier, California)
 Bailey House (Denver, Colorado)
 Bailey House (Fernandina Beach, Florida)
 Maj. James B. Bailey House, in Gainesville, Florida
 Goodwyn-Bailey House, Newnan, Georgia
 Frederick A. Bailey House, in Talbotton, Georgia
 Bailey House Museum, or Hale Hōʻikeʻike at the Bailey House, in Wailuku, Hawaii
 William S. Bailey House, in Macomb, Illinois
 George A. and Mary Tinkel Bailey House, in Correctionville, Iowa
 William H. and Alice Bailey House, in Des Moines, Iowa
 Chiles-Bailey House, in Shelby County, Kentucky
 Moses Bailey House, in Winthrop Center, Maine
 Timothy P. Bailey House, in Andover, Massachusetts
 Bailey House (Ipswich, Massachusetts)
 Liberty Hyde Bailey Birthplace, in South Haven, Michigan
 W. Bailey House, in Eveleth, Minnesota
 J. V. Bailey House, at the Minnesota State Fair, in Falcon Heights, Minnesota
 W. T. Bailey House, in Virginia, Minnesota
 Philo C. Bailey House, in Waseca, Minnesota
 Bailey House (Biloxi, Mississippi), in Harrison County, Mississippi
 Dr. Isham G. Bailey House, in Lamar, Mississippi
 Dodge-Bailey House, in Santa Fe, New Mexico
 Jonathan Bailey House (Milo, New York)
 James Bailey House, New York, New York
 William Bailey House, in Plattsburgh, New York
 Lawrence D. Bailey House, in Clackamas County, Oregon
 John Bailey Farm, in East Fallowfield Township, Pennsylvania
 Gardner-Bailey House, in Edgewood, Pennsylvania
 William L. Bailey House, or Dominic Hall, in Providence, Rhode Island
 Dr. York Bailey House, on Saint Helena Island, South Carolina
 Harry Bailey House, in Lebanon, Tennessee

Other uses
Bailey House (charity), an American charity based in New York for people living with HIV and AIDS

See also

Old Bailey (disambiguation)